Arhavispor is an amateur Turkish football club located in the Arhavi district of Artvin. The club was formed in 1955. The club colours are black and yellow. Arhavispor play their home matches at Arhavi Stadium.

External links 
Arhavispor on TFF.org

Sport in Artvin
Football clubs in Turkey
1955 establishments in Turkey
Association football clubs established in 1955